The Apostolic Prefecture of Lindong (or Lintung) is a missionary pre-diocesan jurisdiction, not entitled to a titular bishop, in China.

It is exempt, i.e. directly subject to the Holy See, not part of any ecclesiastical province.

History 
On 1937.05.18, it was established as Apostolic Prefecture of Lindong 林東 (中文) alias Lintung, on territory split off from the then Apostolic Vicariate of Szepingkai 四平街).

Ordinaries 
(all Roman rite )

Apostolic Prefects of Lindong
 Edgar Larochelle (藍德), Society of Foreign Missions (P.M.E.) (1937.07.23 – 1938), later Superior General of the Society of Foreign Missions (1938.07.11 – 1958.02.19)
 Joseph-Albany-Emilien Massé (馬), P.M.E. (1939.03.31 – 1943.07.29)
 Joseph-Rolland-Gustave Prévost-Godard (趙玉明), P.M.E. (1946.11.28 – 1956.11.11), later Apostolic Vicar of Pucallpa (Peru) (1956.11.11 – 1989.10.23) & Titular Bishop of Ammædara (1956.11.11 – 2005.11.13)
 uncanonical Francis Xavier Guo Zheng-ji (郭正基) (1990 – death 2004.05.03), consecrated Bishop 1990.10.28 without papal mandate
 Matthias Du Jiang (杜江)  (2004– ...); consecrated Bishop clandestinely 2004.05.07

See also
Roman Catholicism in China

Source and External links 
 GigaCatholic, with incumbent biography links

Apostolic prefectures
Roman Catholic dioceses in China